City 41 is a Faisalabad-based news channel which broadcasts news and information about latest happenings and events in the city of Faisalabad in Punjab, Pakistan. The channel is owned by Mohsin Naqvi  who is the founder of City News Group. Naqvi is politically affiliated with Chaudhrys of Gujrat through marriage.

The channel contains a variety of programs in Urdu and English which span from current affairs to general infotainment. City 41 also broadcasts Faisalabad Region news which include Jhang District,
Chiniot District, and Toba Tek Singh District. City41 caters to the needs of over 15 million citizens of Faisalabad Division.  It is the first city specific channel for the residents of this division.  By introducing a local news channel, City41 is able to highlight and bring to the forefront local politics, administration and news stories from this division.

See also
 City 42
 24 News HD
 Rohi
List of news channels in Pakistan

References

Television channels and stations established in 2016
24-hour television news channels in Pakistan
Television networks in Pakistan
Faisalabad
Mass media in Punjab, Pakistan